Elaine Tanner-Watt,  (born February 22, 1951) is a Canadian former competition swimmer. Olympic medallist, and former world record-holder in two events.

Career
Nicknamed "Mighty Mouse" partly because of her small stature (standing barely five feet tall) and partly due to her competitive drive, Tanner had a large impact on Canadian swimming and is considered one of the top performers in the sport.

During the 1966 Commonwealth Games in Kingston, Jamaica, Tanner won four gold medals and three silvers,  becoming the first woman to ever win four golds at a Commonwealth Games and the first person to get seven medals in those games.  She won the Lou Marsh Trophy, recognizing her as Canada's best athlete in 1966 — the youngest person to ever receive the award — and was also selected as the country's top athlete overall.  The following year at the 1967 Pan American Games in Winnipeg, Tanner won two gold and three silver medals, breaking two world records in the process.  Tanner arrived at the 1968 Summer Olympics in Mexico City as a heavy medal favorite.  She won three Olympic medals in Mexico City, including two individual silver medals and one relay bronze. However, the media deemed the lack of gold a disappointment and led Tanner to suffer from depression, retiring from competition after the 1968 Olympics at just 18 years of age.

Despite being of Canadian nationality she also won the ASA National British Championships over 110 yards butterfly in 1965.

Awards and accolades
In 1969, she was made an Officer of the Order of Canada and was inducted into Canada's Sports Hall of Fame in 1971.  The Elaine Tanner Award has been presented to Canada's top junior female athlete since 1972.

Personal life
Following the games, Tanner fell into a depression that lasted decades, developed a serious eating disorder, suffered anxiety attacks and had her first marriage end after 9 years in 1980, with two children that wound up going to the custody of the father in Prince George as Tanner remained in Vancouver. Roaming around Canada doing odd jobs and eventually having a failed second marriage that ended in 1987, by 1988 she was living off her car, jobless, and feeling suicidal, but eventually found her footing again after meeting former lifeguard John Watt. She married him five years later, and lives with him in White Rock, British Columbia. They have a charity organization, Team Underdog.

Bibliography
Monkey Guy And The Cosmic Fairy (2015) - children's book
Quest Beyond Gold (TBD) - autobiography

See also
 List of members of the International Swimming Hall of Fame
 List of Olympic medalists in swimming (women)
 World record progression 100 metres backstroke
 World record progression 200 metres backstroke

References

External links
 
 
 Personal website

1951 births
Living people
Swimmers from Vancouver
Medalists at the 1968 Summer Olympics
Canadian female freestyle swimmers
Canadian female backstroke swimmers
Canadian female butterfly swimmers
Canadian female medley swimmers
Olympic swimmers of Canada
Swimmers at the 1968 Summer Olympics
Swimmers at the 1967 Pan American Games
Swimmers at the 1966 British Empire and Commonwealth Games
Olympic bronze medalists in swimming
Olympic silver medalists for Canada
Olympic bronze medalists for Canada
Pan American Games gold medalists for Canada
Pan American Games silver medalists for Canada
Commonwealth Games gold medallists for Canada
Commonwealth Games silver medallists for Canada
World record setters in swimming
Officers of the Order of Canada
Lou Marsh Trophy winners
Olympic silver medalists in swimming
Commonwealth Games medallists in swimming
Pan American Games medalists in swimming
Medalists at the 1967 Pan American Games
20th-century Canadian women
Medallists at the 1966 British Empire and Commonwealth Games